was one of fourteen s built for the Imperial Japanese Navy during World War II.

Background and description
The Etorofu class was an improved version of the preceding  with a greater emphasis on anti-submarine warfare.

The main armament of the Etorofu class consisted of three Type 3  guns in single mounts, one superfiring pair aft and one mount forward of the superstructure. They were built with four Type 96  anti-aircraft guns in two twin-gun mounts, but the total was increased to 15 guns by August 1943. 36 depth charges were stowed aboard initially, but this later increased by August 1943 to 60 depth charges with a Type 97  trench mortar and six depth charge throwers. They received Type 22 and Type 13 radars and Type 93 sonar in 1943–44.

Construction and career
Matsuwa was launched by Mitsui, Tumano, on 19 April 1942 and completed on 1 April 1943. On 2 August 1944, she was torpedoed and sunk by the submarine  in Hidai Bay.

Notes

References

External links
 Matsuwa on combinedfleet.com

World War II naval ships of Japan
Ships sunk by American submarines
Etorofu-class escort ships
1942 ships
Maritime incidents in August 1944
Ships built by Mitsui Engineering and Shipbuilding
Shipwrecks of the Philippines
Shipwrecks in the South China Sea